Birthday is a 2007 EP released by The Crüxshadows. It is the second single release from the 2007 album DreamCypher. A fan favorite, the band's wish was granted when it outsold their previous single/EP, Sophia. To the band's delight, Birthday hit #1 on the Hot Dance Singles Sales chart and #2 on the Hot 100 Singles Sales chart on September 13, 2007, while Sophia hit again at #3 and #23, respectively.

Track listing
"Birthday"
"Birthday" (Radio edit)
"The Eighth Square"
"Birthday" (Through the Looking Glass club mix)
"White Rabbit" Cover on the Jefferson Airplane song

External links
 The Crüxshadows' official website

The Crüxshadows EPs
2007 EPs